The Golden Guides, originally Golden Nature Guides, were a series of 160-page, pocket-sized books created by Western Publishing and published under their "Golden Press" line (primarily a children's book imprint) from 1949.  Edited by Herbert S. Zim and Vera Webster, the books were written by experts in their field and illustrated in a simple straightforward style.

Intended for primary and secondary school level readers, the first books were field guides illustrated by James Gordon Irving, with such titles as Birds (1949), Insects (1951), and Mammals (1955). The series later expanded beyond identification guides to cover a wider range of subjects, such as Geology (1972), Scuba Diving (1968), and Indian Arts (1970).

In 1966, Zim launched a related series, the Golden Field Guides, aimed at high school or college-age readers.

An updated series was relaunched in 2001 as "Golden Guides by St. Martin's Press", illustrated largely with photographs but retaining some of the original 1950s illustrations.

List of Golden Guides

References

External links
 Golden Guide from St. Martin's Press - Current list of Golden Guides
 List of the original Golden Guide titles with links to cover images

Golden Books books
Science books
Series of books
Publications established in 1949
Western Publishing